Mermaid-Stratford is a provincial electoral district for the Legislative Assembly of Prince Edward Island, Canada. It was contested for the first time in the 2019 Prince Edward Island general election, and was previously part of the district of Vernon River-Stratford.

Members

Election results

References

Prince Edward Island provincial electoral districts